Aslan Kazbekovich Karatsev (born 4 September 1993) is a Russian-Israeli professional tennis player. He reached a career-high singles ATP ranking of world No. 14 on 7 February 2022, and peaked at No. 76 in the doubles rankings on 16 May 2022.

In February 2021, Karatsev went through qualifiers for the Australian Open. In his first main draw of a major, ranked 114th, he defeated 8th seed Diego Schwartzman, 20th seed Félix Auger-Aliassime and 18th seed Grigor Dimitrov to reach the semifinals. Karatsev is the first man in the Open Era to reach the semifinals in his Grand Slam debut.

In March 2021, he won his first ATP title at the Qatar Open with Andrey Rublev in doubles. A week later, as a wildcard, Karatsev won his first ATP singles title at the 2021 Dubai Open, beating South African Lloyd Harris in the final. Karatsev, who was unseeded and beat four seeded players to reach the final, joined Wayne Ferreira (1995) and Thomas Muster (1997) in this achievement. As a result, he entered the top 30 of the ATP singles rankings for the first time in his career. On 24 April 2021, Karatsev defeated the world No. 1 Novak Djokovic on his home court at the Serbia Open to reach the final. At the 2020 Summer Olympics, he won the silver medal with Elena Vesnina in mixed doubles.

Early life
Karatsev was born in Vladikavkaz. His father Kazbek Karatsev is an ethnic Ossetian and former footballer, and his mother Svetlana Karatseva is a medical doctor. Aslan has an older sister named Zarina. Karatsev's grandfather on his mother's side is Jewish. 

When Karatsev was three years old he and his parents moved to Israel, making aliyah, and they lived in Israel for the next nine years.  He started playing tennis there, in Tel Aviv-Jaffa. His first coach was Vladimir Rabinovich. His mother and sister live in Holon, Israel. Karatsev speaks fluent Hebrew, and says that Israel still feels like home. 

When he was 12, he moved back to Russia, with his father, because of funding limitations in Israel. He moved to Taganrog where his new coaches were Alexander Kuprin and Ivan Potapov. From 2011 to 2013 he was coached by Andrey Kesarev.

Karatsev fluently speaks Russian, Hebrew, and English, and holds dual Russian-Israeli citizenship.

Career

Junior career
Karatsev played his first junior match in September 2007 at the age of 14 at a grade 5 tournament in Russia. Although being his junior debut, it would be his only junior tournament until May 2009 where he started to play consistently in junior tennis. He made his junior grand slam debut at the 2011 Junior French Open after qualifying for the main draw but lost in the first round. He then participated in 2011 Junior Wimbledon with resulted in him again losing in the first round and then the 2011 Junior US Open where he won his first round match but lost in the second round. In doubles, he was known for partnering good friend Evgeny Karlovskiy in most tournaments and the pair made the quarterfinals of the 2011 Junior French Open. He ended his junior career after the 2011 US Open with a career-high ranking of No. 47 (attained on August 8, 2011) and a win–loss record of 76–48 in singles and 26–16 in doubles.

Junior Grand Slam results – Singles:

Australian Open: A (-)
French Open: 1R (2011)
Wimbledon: 1R (2011)
US Open: 2R (2011)

Junior Grand Slam results – Doubles:

Australian Open: A (-)
French Open: QF (2011)
Wimbledon: 1R (2011)
US Open: 2R (2011)

2013–20
Karatsev made his ATP Tour main-draw debut at the 2013 St. Petersburg Open, where he received entry to the main draw due to a wildcard. In the first round, he lost to compatriot and second seed Mikhail Youzhny. In the doubles event, he partnered Dmitry Tursunov and they reached the semifinals, losing to Dominic Inglot and Denis Istomin in a narrow deciding tiebreaker. In 2015, he won his first main-draw match on the ATP Tour at the Kremlin Cup, defeating Youzhny.

According to his father, Karatsev at 19 was mentored by Dmitry Tursunov who traveled with him to Halle, Germany to train there for a couple of months but returned due to a lack of money to continue. Then, the German academy itself invited Aslan to return to Halle. He trained there for two years, then got injured and could not really play for two years because of the trauma. He moved to Barcelona where he played at the Bruguera Tennis Academy for less than two years.

After searching for better coaching opportunities in Spain and Germany, Karatsev in 2019 hired his new coach, Yahor Yatsyk from Minsk. Yatsyk, a former professional tennis player one year his senior, used to help Nikoloz Basilashvili as a coach. During the COVID-19 lockdown Karatsev played exhibition matches in the United States.

At St. Petersburg, Karatsev earned his first top-50 win against Tennys Sandgren.

2021: Australian Open semifinalist, Olympic silver medal, top 15
Karatsev made his Grand Slam debut at the Australian Open, after coming through qualifying by beating Brandon Nakashima, Max Purcell and Alexandre Müller. It was here that he also notched his first top-10 victory, after upsetting 8th seed and world No. 9, Diego Schwartzman. He also upset 20th seed Félix Auger-Aliassime after dropping the first two sets and coming back to win in five to become the first qualifier to reach a Grand Slam quarterfinal since Bernard Tomic at Wimbledon 2011, and the first man to reach a quarterfinal in his Grand Slam debut since Alex Rădulescu in 1996 Wimbledon. He then defeated the former No. 3 player Grigor Dimitrov in four sets to reach the semifinals. 
By doing this, Karatsev became the first qualifier to reach the semifinals of a Grand Slam since Vladimir Voltchkov in 2000 Wimbledon and the first to do so at the Australian Open since Bob Giltinan in 1977, the lowest-ranked player to reach a Grand Slam semifinal since Goran Ivanišević in 2001 Wimbledon, and the first player to reach a Grand Slam semifinal on debut in the Open Era history. There, he lost to world No. 1 and eventual champion, Novak Djokovic, in straight sets. His run at the tournament raised his ranking from 114 to a career-high of world No. 42.

Karatsev's next tournament was Doha, where he beat Mubarak Shannan Zayid in straight sets in the first round, but lost to top seed Dominic Thiem in the second round after taking the first set in a tiebreak. He entered the doubles draw with compatriot Andrey Rublev and reached the semifinals, where they defeated Jérémy Chardy and Fabrice Martin. In the final, they defeated Marcus Daniell and Philipp Oswald in straight sets. Winning the tournament raised his doubles ranking from No. 447 to a career-high of No. 222. In Dubai, he beat Egor Gerasimov, Dan Evans and Lorenzo Sonego to reach his first ATP 500 quarterfinal, where he beat Jannik Sinner in three sets to advance to his first ATP 500 semifinal. In the semifinal, Karatsev ended the 23-match winning streak of second seed Andrey Rublev at ATP 500 events to reach his first singles final. In the final, he defeated Lloyd Harris to win his first title. The win allowed Karatsev to break into the top 30 for the first time in his career. He has become the second Russian tennis player to win his maiden title at 27, a record shared with Igor Kunitsyn.

At the Serbia Open, Karatsev avenged his loss at the Australian Open by defeating world No. 1, Novak Djokovic, to advance to the final in the longest match of 2021 thus far. He was then defeated by Matteo Berrettini in three sets.

Karatsev notched two more top-ten wins, beating Schwartzman again in Madrid, and compatriot Daniil Medvedev in Rome.

At the French Open, Karatsev lost in men's singles to Philipp Kohlschreiber in the second round. However, he partnered with Elena Vesnina in mixed doubles, and on his debut advanced to the final, but the pair lost to Joe Salisbury and Desirae Krawczyk.

At the Tokyo Olympics, he won the silver medal in mixed doubles with Elena Vesnina losing to compatriots Andrey Rublev and Anastasia Pavlyuchenkova in the final. He also participated in the singles and doubles events where he reached the second and lost in the first round, respectively.

In his debut at a Masters-1000 level in doubles, Karatsev reached the quarterfinals at the National Bank Open in Toronto partnering with Dušan Lajović. As a result, he entered the top 200 in doubles at world No. 172, on 16 August 2021. In singles seeded 15th and having a first round bye, he lost in the second round to Karen Khachanov.

At the 2021 BNP Paribas Open in Indian Wells, he reached the fourth round at a Master 1000 for the first time in his career defeating 9th seed Denis Shapovalov before he lost to 8th seed Hubert Hurkacz. In doubles he reached the final with compatriot Rublev where they lost to Polasek/Peers. As a result, he reached the top 100 in the doubles rankings at World No. 92 on 18 October 2021.

At the 2021 Kremlin Cup in Moscow, Karatsev defeated compatriot Karen Khachanov in the semifinals to reach his third final of the season and in his career. He then defeated 6th seed Marin Čilić in the final to win his 2nd career title. With his successful run in Moscow, he made his debut in the top 20 in the rankings, rising to a ranking of World No. 19 on 25 October 2021.

On 8 November 2021, Karatsev peaked at world no. 15 and was named as the third alternate for the ATP Finals.

2022: Sydney title, match fixing allegations
Karatsev started his 2022 season at the Sydney Classic. As the top seed, he beat fifth seed and world No. 27, Lorenzo Sonego, in the quarterfinals. He then defeated third seed and world No. 26, Dan Evans, in the semifinals in a tight three-set match, to reach his fourth ATP singles final. He won his third ATP singles title by defeating Andy Murray in the final. Seeded 18th and last year semifinalist at the Australian Open, he lost in the third round to Adrian Mannarino in four sets.

After the Australian Open, Karatsev competed at the Maharashtra Open in Pune, India. As the top seed, he was eliminated from the tournament in the second round by qualifier Elias Ymer. Seeded seventh at the Rotterdam Open, he was beaten in the first round by Dutch wildcard Tallon Griekspoor, despite having two match points during the match. Seeded fourth at the Open 13, he reached the quarterfinals where he lost to ninth seed Benjamin Bonzi. Seeded seventh and the defending champion at the Dubai Championships, he was defeated in the first round by Mackenzie McDonald.

Karatsev, his coach Yahor Yatsyk and fellow tennis player Nikoloz Basilashvili were involved in allegations of match fixing. Karatsev made a statement saying he was 'unaware' of the allegations.

2023: Loss of form, out of top 100

Performance timelines

Singles
Current through the 2022 Cincinnati.

Doubles

Significant finals

Grand Slam finals

Mixed doubles: 1 (runner-up)

Olympic finals

Mixed doubles: 1 (silver medal)

ATP Masters 1000

Doubles: 1 (1 runner-up)

ATP career finals

Singles: 4 (3 titles, 1 runner-up)

Doubles: 2 (1 title, 1 runner-up)

Other finals

Universiade medal matches

Singles: 1 (silver medal)

Challenger and Futures/World Tennis Tour Finals

Singles: 21 (13 titles, 8 runner-ups)

Doubles: 8 (4 titles, 4 runner-ups)

National representation

Davis Cup (0–1)

   indicates the outcome of the Davis Cup match followed by the score, date, place of event, the zonal classification and its phase, and the court surface.

ATP Cup (0–3)

Record against top 10 players
Karatsev's record against players who have been ranked in the top 10, with those who are active in boldface. Only ATP Tour main draw matches are considered:

Wins over top 10 players
Karatsev has a  record against players who were, at the time the match was played, ranked in the top 10.

* .

Awards and honours

International
ATP Most Improved Player: 2021.

National
The Russian Cup in the nominations:
Junior of the Year: 2011;
Olympians-2020;
Team of the Year: 2021.
  Sports title "Merited Master of Sports of Russia" (6 August 2021).
 Medal of the Order "For Merit to the Fatherland", 1st class (11 August 2021).
Regional
  Medal "For the Glory of Ossetia" (10 September 2021).

See also
List of sportspeople with dual nationality

Notes

References

External links

 
 
 

1993 births
Living people
Russian Jews
Russian male tennis players
Universiade medalists in tennis
Tennis players from Moscow
Sportspeople from Vladikavkaz
Universiade gold medalists for Russia
Universiade silver medalists for Russia
Universiade bronze medalists for Russia
Medalists at the 2015 Summer Universiade
Medalists at the 2017 Summer Universiade
Jewish tennis players
Israeli male tennis players
Israeli people of Russian-Jewish descent
Ossetian people
Russian emigrants to Israel
Russian expatriates in Belarus
Tennis players at the 2020 Summer Olympics
Olympic tennis players of Russia
Olympic silver medalists for the Russian Olympic Committee athletes
Medalists at the 2020 Summer Olympics
Olympic medalists in tennis